The Cebeci–Smith model, developed by Tuncer Cebeci and Apollo M. O. Smith in 1967, is a 0-equation eddy viscosity model used in computational fluid dynamics analysis of turbulence in boundary layer flows. The model gives eddy viscosity, as a function of the local boundary layer velocity profile. The model is suitable for high-speed flows with thin attached boundary layers, typically present in aerospace applications.  Like the Baldwin-Lomax model, it is not suitable for large regions of flow separation and significant curvature or  rotation.  Unlike the Baldwin-Lomax model, this model requires the determination of a boundary layer edge.

Equations 

In a two-layer model, the boundary layer is considered to comprise two layers: inner (close to the surface) and outer. The eddy viscosity is calculated separately for each layer and combined using:

The inner-region eddy viscosity is given by:

where

with the von Karman constant  usually being taken as 0.4, and with

The eddy viscosity in the outer region is given by:

where ,  is the displacement thickness, given by

and FK is the Klebanoff intermittency function given by

References 

 Smith, A.M.O. and Cebeci, T., 1967. Numerical solution of the turbulent boundary layer equations. Douglas aircraft division report DAC 33735
 Cebeci, T. and Smith, A.M.O., 1974. Analysis of turbulent boundary layers. Academic Press, 
 Wilcox, D.C., 1998. Turbulence Modeling for CFD. , 2nd Ed., DCW Industries, Inc.

External links 

 This article was based on the Cebeci Smith model article in CFD-Wiki

Turbulence models
Fluid dynamics
Mathematical modeling